The Logie for Most Popular Comedy Program is an award presented annually at the Australian TV Week Logie Awards. It recognises the popularity of an Australian comedy program, which over the years have included scripted comedy series, sketch comedy, variety comedy shows and panel comedy shows.

It was first awarded at the 19th Annual TV Week Logie Awards, held in 1977 when the award was originally called Most Popular Australian Comedy. Over the years, it has been known as Most Popular Variety/Panel Comedy Show (1978), Most Popular Comedy Show (1979, 1981, 1983), Most Popular Variety/Comedy Show (1980), Most Popular Comedy Series (1982), Most Popular Comedy Series (1985).

The award was discontinued in 1986 when nominees were included in the Most Popular Australian Light Entertainment Program category. From 1989 to 1992, that award was known as the Most Popular Light Entertainment Program/Comedy award.

The category was reinstated as the Most Comedy Program in 1993 until 1999. In 2000, the categories were again combined as the Most Popular Comedy/Light Entertainment Program award. From 2018, the award category name was restored as Most Popular Comedy Program.

The winner and nominees of this category are chosen by the public through an online voting survey on the TV Week website. Full Frontal holds the record for the most wins, with four, followed by The Paul Hogan Show and Fast Forward with three each.

Winners and nominees

From 2000 to 2017, comedy nominees were included in the Logie Award for Most Popular Entertainment Program category.

Multiple wins

See also
 Logie Award for Most Popular Entertainment Program

References

External links

Awards established in 1977